Edward Frank Wente (born 1930) is an American professor emeritus of Egyptology and the Department of Near Eastern Languages and Civilizations at the University of Chicago. He received his Ph.D. from the University of Chicago in 1959 and lectured there from 1963 to 1996. He is also a longstanding member of the Oriental Institute, Chicago. One of his major works is Letters from Ancient Egypt (1990), published by the Scholarly Press. In 1999 the Oriental Institute published a collection of essays by Egyptologists in honor of Edward Wente "Gold of Praise: Studies on Ancient Egypt in Honor of Edward F. Wente". His wife is Dr. Leila Ibrahim Wente, also an Egyptologist.

See also
List of Egyptologists

References

Further references
Wente, Edward F. (1990). Letters from Ancient Egypt. Edited by Edmund S. Meltzer. Translated by Edward F. Wente. Atlanta: Scholars Press, Society of Biblical Literature. .

American Egyptologists
University of Chicago faculty
University of Chicago alumni
Living people
1930 births